Maidarjavyn Ganzorig (5 February 1949 – 4 July 2021) was a Mongolian cosmonaut and academic. 

In 1978, he participated in the Soviet Intercosmos program and trained for the Soyuz 39 mission.

Biography
Ganzorig was born in Tsetserleg, Arkhangai in 1949, finishing his secondary education in 1968. He studied at Kyiv Polytechnic Institute, earning a degree in heating and precision automated devices maintenance, graduating in 1975. In 1978, he was selected as the backup to Jügderdemidiin Gürragchaa for the Soyuz 39 mission, who would become the first Mongolian in space.

In 1984, he received a Candidate of Technical Sciences degree.

From 1984 to 1991 Ganzorig was Head of the RS Laboratory at the Institute of Physics and Technology, Mongolian Academy of Sciences, and since 1991 served as the Director of Informatics at the Remote Sensing Center, Mongolian Academy of Sciences, Ulaanbaatar.

References

External links
Spacefacts biography of Maidarjavyn Ganzorig

1949 births
2021 deaths
Mongolian cosmonauts
Recipients of the Medal "For Merit in Space Exploration"
Mongolian People's Party politicians
Kyiv Polytechnic Institute alumni
People from Arkhangai Province